Lindsay James (born 6 February 1984) is a Greek softball player. She competed in the women's tournament at the 2004 Summer Olympics.

References

1984 births
Living people
Greek softball players
Olympic softball players of Greece
Softball players at the 2004 Summer Olympics
People from Redwood City, California
Softball players from California